The women's 5000 metres event at the 2021 European Athletics U23 Championships was held in Tallinn, Estonia, at Kadriorg Stadium on 11 July.

Records
Prior to the competition, the records were as follows:

Results
Hand timing due to stadium power cut

References

5000 metres
5000 metres at the European Athletics U23 Championships